Grylloblatta barberi is a North American species of wingless insect in the genus Grylloblatta. It is a rock crawler that lives at high altitudes in crevices under snow or glaciers. It was first described by Andrew Nelson Caudell in 1924.

Range
Specimens have been collected in the North Fork Feather River area of California.

References

Insects described in 1924
Grylloblattidae